The Eilat Gang Rape occurred in the summer of 2020 at a hotel in the Israeli resort town of Eilat. By late August, Israeli police had arrested 14 suspects in connection with the case. The victim was 16 years old. A group of men lined up outside her hotel room door taking turns to rape her while she was intoxicated. Eyewitnesses, who police believe were in the room while the rapes occurred, did nothing, according to the prosecution:

One of the suspects, a young man from Hadera, admitted filming the girl's rape but denied wrongdoing. He claimed that he attempted to help the victim. He and another Hadera resident are the main suspects among the 14 who were arrested and he has been remanded into custody. They are accused of bringing the intoxicated girl to the hotel room and raping her. Also charged are two 17 year old twin brothers from Lachish. Six minors from Lachish were charged with failure to stop a crime, aiding rape and other charges according to their alleged participation.

According to the prosecutor's statement, the men "carried out one after another, over the course of about an hour, sometimes as a group, cruel sex crimes against a minor out of loss of humanity and while blatantly ignoring her anguish."

One of the minors was convicted after reaching a plea bargain agreement with the prosecution in May 2021. He will be placed under house arrest between the hours of 23:00 to 06:00.

Benjamin Netanyahu called it "a crime against humanity".

References

Rape in Israel